Local elections were held in Valenzuela on May 13, 2013, within the Philippine general election. The voters elected local posts in the city: the mayor, vice mayor, the two Congressmen (or district representatives), and the councilors, six in each of the city's two legislative districts.

Representative Rexlon Gatchalian, a brother to the current mayor Sherwin, is running for the city mayor's office for the first time. Gatchalian's primary opponent is Adelma Gunigundo, wife of the incumbent second district representative Magtanggol Gunigundo.

Gatchalian's running mate is vice mayor Eric Martinez, who has served since 2007; if he wins, he will have his term limited in 2016. First district councilor Katherine Pineda-Hernandez is Gunigundo's running mate.

The election was won by Gatchalian and Martinez for the local posts.

Mayoral and vice mayoral election
Incumbent mayor Sherwin Gatchalian is now on his third term as the mayor of Valenzuela. As prescribed by the 1987 Constitution of the Philippines, he is barred from running as the mayor and he may choose to run into higher or lower office instead. Prior to his election as mayor in 2004, he represented the first district of Valenzuela from 2001 to 2004. In April 2012, he signed his intention to run for the Senate race under the Pwersa ng Masang Pilipino party headed by former President Joseph Ejercito Estrada.

He instead would run as representative of the 1st District of the city. His brother, incumbent congressman Rexlon Gatchalian who is on his second term is running in his place. Rexlon Gatchalian, also known as Rex, is on his second term as district representative/congressman, hence he is not yet term limited. Rex entered Valenzuela politics in 2007 occupying his current post. The other candidate for mayorship is Adelma A. Yang-Gunigundo, wife to the incumbent second district representative Magtanggol Gunigundo.

There are only two candidates for vice mayor's office: incumbent vice mayor and Liberal's Eric M. Martinez and incumbent first district councilor Katherine "Khay" C. Pineda.

Congressional elections 
There are two and three candidates for the congressman or district representative post of the districts 1 and 2 of Valenzuela, respectively. The city is divided into two congressional districts: the first district encompasses 23 barangays in the northern portion of the city and the second district which contains 9 barangays.

The incumbent first district representative Rexlon "Rex" Gatchalian running under the Nationalist People's Coalition, the same political party he had during the 2007 election. Gatchalian, a businessman, is the younger brother of the incumbent mayor Sherwin Gatchalian. The other candidate for congressman is Ritche Cuadra, a member of Valenzuela City Council since 2001.

For the second district, the incumbent representative Magtanggol "Magi" Gunigundo will run under the Lakas-Kampi-CMD party. A lawyer by profession, he became the representative of the former municipality of Valenzuela from 1998-2001. If he will be elected to office in 2013, this will be his third term, thus he is not eligible to re-election in 2016 for the same position. The second candidate is Shalani Carla "Lani" Soledad-Romulo, a member of the Valenzuela city council and wife to Pasig Representative Roman Romulo. Soledad-Romulo gained prominence as a former girlfriend to President Benigno Aquino III from 2008-2010 and as a TV host at television network TV5 since 2010. The other candidate for congressman is Pablo "Pabs" Hernandez III, a columnist from the tabloid Bulgar who ran for the mayoralty race inn 2010.

Unlike in 2010 polls, few of the people who run for the city council are up for reelection. For the first district, this list includes Idol Alejandrino, Cora Cortez and Tony Espiritu; Adrian Dapat, Cecil Mayo, Lorie Natividad-Borja, and Lai Nolasco for the second district. Two of candidates from each district are also former members of the council: Mar Morelos and Lotlot Esteban. Rovin Feliciano and Ricarr Enriquez are barangay captains of Arkong Bato and Pasolo, respectively. Genny Esplana who targets the first district council, is the titleholder for the 1990 Bb. Pilipinas-International; Charee Pineda, who vies second district councils, is a member of ABS-CBN's Star Magic circle and held the lead role in 2011 daytime drama series Angelito: Batang Ama.

Mock polls 
Mock polls are done in different parts of the city to survey possible winners to the 2013 midterm elections. Based on a February 2013 mock polls done by the Valenzuela City District Two Voters Group, an independent non-government group, conducted by former dean Rolando Lansigan, the following candidates garnered the spot for the second district:

Election results
The winners of the congressional, mayor and vice mayor seats of Valenzuela City is determined with the highest number of votes received. These positions are voted separately, so there is a possibility that the winning officials came from the same or different political parties.

Mayoral election
Incumbent Sherwin T. Gatchalian is running for representative of the city's first district.

Vice mayoral election
Incumbent Eric M. Martinez is running for reelection.

Congressional elections

First district
Incumbent Rexlon Gatchalian is running for the mayorship; his brother, Mayor Sherwin Gatchalian, is his party's nominee.

Second district
Magtanggol Gunigundo is the incumbent. He will be facing off against councilor Shalani Soledad-Romulo, if Soledad-Romulo elected she will join her husband Roman in the House separately.

City council elections 

The voters in the city are set to elect six councilors on the district where they are living, hence registered. Candidates are voted separately so there are chances where winning candidates will have unequal number of votes and may come from different political parties.

Summary

First district council

 
 
 
 
 
 
|-bgcolor=black
|colspan=5|

Second district council

 
 
 
 {{Election box winning candidate with party link no change|
   |party      = Nationalist People's Coalition
   |candidate  = T'   |votes      = 58,399
   |percentage = 9.80
 }}
 
 
|-bgcolor=black
|colspan=5|

 

 

 
 
 

ReferencesNotes M Part of the primary opposition coalition named Team Matulungin.
 V Part of the administration coalition named Team Valenzuela''.
 Official List of Candidates for the City of Valenzuela, 2013

2013 Philippine local elections
Elections in Valenzuela, Metro Manila
2013 elections in Metro Manila